The FIA Formula Two Championship was a one-make class of auto racing for Formula Two open wheeled single seater racing cars. The championship was contested each year from 2009 to 2012. It was a revival of the former European Formula Two Championship that was previously run from 1967 to 1984. Organised by MotorSport Vision, drivers competed over 16 rounds at eight venues, in identical cars built by Williams Grand Prix Engineering, with 400 bhp engines developed by Mountune Racing and supplied by Audi. 

Formula Two was revived due to the Fédération Internationale de l'Automobile's concern that the cost of competing in motor racing at a level to progress directly to Formula One was becoming unreachable for many participants, and the category was re-introduced as a lower-cost alternative for drivers. The FIA tender to supply and operate the  Championship was awarded to the British MotorSportVision Racing company, owned by former Formula One racer Jonathan Palmer.

Compared to rival series such as GP2 and Formula Renault 3.5, Formula Two cost significantly less per season whilst allowing drivers to prove their skill and develop their racecraft, in identical vehicles designed by a six-man team from Williams Grand Prix Engineering, led by Director of Engineering Patrick Head. The F2 vehicles were assembled and prepared between races at MotorSport Vision's Bedford Autodrome facility, prior to each championship event.

In December 2012, MotorSport Vision announced that the series would not be run in 2013.

The car

Chassis
Named after both Jonathan Palmer and Patrick Head, the Williams JPH1 chassis and survival cell is of carbon fibre composite monocoque construction. The car was designed to comply with 2005 FIA F1 Safety Regulations. Head protection conforms to the latest 2009 F1 standards. Amongst many other detailed safety features, roadwheel tethers are incorporated.

The aerodynamics have been evolved to produce a high level of downforce, yet without losing too much front downforce when following other cars, to facilitate overtaking. To achieve this, about 40% of the downforce is produced from the underside, with full length ground effect tunnels, similar to a GP2 car. The aerodynamics have been developed using the Williams F1 computational fluid dynamics (CFD) computer simulation which enables many different configurations to be tested without the need to actually build the parts and test in the wind tunnel.

Powertrain
The internal combustion engine is a new turbocharged petrol engine based on the Audi 1.8-litre 20 valve block and head, as used in Formula Palmer Audi. Whereas the engine in the FPA car primarily uses standard road car components, the Audi F2 engine has been developed as a pure race engine. Prepared and built by Mountune Racing, the crankshaft, connecting rods, pistons, valves and camshafts are all-new components designed for high strength and light weight. The dry sump system has been re-designed so the engine sits  lower than in the FPA car.

The turbocharger is an all new Garrett GT35 unit featuring roller bearings for improved response, with an external wastegate with high speed closed loop pneumatic valve boost control for absolutely precise automatic boost control. The engine management system is a Pi Research Pectel electronic engine control unit (ECU), the MQ12, which has more capability than the unit in FPA.

The F2 car features a "push to pass/defend" overboost, with  being available for a maximum duration of 6 seconds, available ten times during each race.

The transmission is a new unit designed by Hewland specifically for Formula Two, the TMT. It has six forward speeds, and is operated by steering wheel mounted paddle shifters.

The performance of the F2 car is behind a F1 car, but faster than a F3 car. Its closest rival in terms of lap time is a Formula Renault 3.5.

Race weekend

This increased to 2 x 40 minute races in 2011.

All drivers had their cars prepared and entered centrally by MSV. Drivers worked with a single mechanic throughout the season, and a rotating group of engineers. This means that a driver's finances had no effect on performance and no one could gain an unfair advantage as every car was operated by the same team.

Scoring system
For the 2009 season, the scoring system was 10–8–6–5–4–3–2–1 for the top eight race positions. In 2010, Formula Two adopted  the same scoring system change as in Formula One, with points awarded to the top ten finishers. Points were awarded the same for both races in the weekend, as follows:

Champions

Television
The races were broadcast by the sports broadcaster Motors TV. Every race was screened live at fixed times, with several repeat showings.

F2 also had a one-hour highlights program distributed worldwide, and featured prominently in the global Motorsports Mundial program.
 
Live streaming of the races was available with free access on the official F2 website.

References

External links

FormulaTwo.com official website of the FIA Formula Two Championship
How Formula 2 can work, GrandPrix.com (18/07/2008)

 
One-make series
Recurring sporting events established in 2009
Recurring sporting events disestablished in 2012
Defunct auto racing series